Aiyyaa is a 2012 Indian Hindi-language parody film starring Rani Mukerji and Prithviraj Sukumaran in the lead roles. It was written and directed by Sachin Kundalkar and jointly produced by Anurag Kashyap and Viacom 18 Motion Pictures. The trailer was released on 6 September 2012. The movie was released on 12 October 2012 worldwide.

Plot 
The story is about a Marathi girl Meenakshi Deshpande falling in love with a Tamil artist Surya. She is a librarian at a college. She has five members in her family (including herself): A wheelchair using grandmother who is blind and has gold teeth, her father who smokes four cigarettes together, her mother who is obsessed with Meenakshi's marriage, and her brother Nana whose only love in life is dogs. To escape the craziness of her family, Meenakshi lives her life in dreams. In her dreams the only thing she's doing is dancing and enacting her favourite actresses, Madhuri Dixit, Sridevi, and Juhi Chawla. Her colleague Maina, nicknamed "Gaga Bai", is an eccentric woman who dresses up in weird ensembles inspired by pop star Lady Gaga.

Meenakshi's family is looking for a suitable groom but Meenakshi, who doesn't believe in arranged marriages, is waiting for her prince and wants her dream wedding. That's when Surya enters. Surya is an art student, and the moment Meenakshi looks at him she falls in love with his tanned skin and a mysterious fragrance emanating from him. By this time her family has found the 'right guy' Madhav for her and is rushing with her wedding.

The rest of the film involves Madhav running after Meenakshi, and Meenakshi following Surya. Nana gets engaged to Maina under bizarre circumstances when Meenakshi goes missing on her engagement when she was following Surya and ends up in his incense sticks factory. Meenakshi learns that Surya's fragrance, that she got enthralled by, was because of his involvement in the factory. In the end, Meenakshi succeeds in winning over Surya's heart and they get engaged in a traditional Maharashtrian ceremony.

Cast 
 Rani Mukerji as Meenakshi Deshpande
 Prithviraj Sukumaran as Surya
 Jyoti Subhash as Grandmother
 Nirmiti Sawant as Mother (Aai)
 Anita Date-Kelkar as Maina
 Subodh Bhave as Madhav Rajadhyaksha
 Amey Wagh as Nana
 Satish Alekar as Meenakshi's Baba
 Kishori Ballal as Surya's mother
 Pakkada Pandi as Pakkada Pandi
 Devnendra Joshi as Babloo
 Madhura Deshpande as Kamala
 Isha Wadnekar as Anju 
 Vineet Vatve as Purohit

Production 
Pre-production started in August 2011 and the film went into shooting by the first week of October 2011. The shooting ended in April 2012, and the film was released on 12 October 2012.

Certifications 
Aiyyaa was given a UA by the CBFC despite the sexual scenes.

The BBFC gave Aiyya a 12a for infrequent moderate sex and drug references.

Soundtrack

Reception 

The soundtrack received positive reviews on release. Music Aloud's review rated it 8/10. Musicperk.com rated the album 8/10 quoting "Aga Bhai, Mahek Bhi, What To Do and Dreamum Wakeupum are the picks of the album". Shresht Poddar, of Score Magazine, gave the album 3 out of 5 stars saying, "Melody-wise, the album is just above average. Innovation-wise, it scores full marks from me. Amit Trivedi dares to be experimental when his contemporaries are staying safe by sticking to tried-and-tested methods." Suhail mir of Gomolo, gave the soundtrack 4 out of 5 stars mentioning, "'Aiyyaa' is a triumphant album all the way. Dares to be quality entertainer with experimental tracks that are promising. Amit trivedi shows his real – class with 'Aiyyaa', a mix of styles, tastes and generes. An intelligently packaged complication."

Rumnique Nannar said "Aiyyaa is one of the most spirited and hilarious albums in such a long time that lives up to its trailer and wacky style. Each of the songs has something to celebrate and enjoy, and it is often so rare to hear an album so joyous and downright fun." and gave 4 on 5. Moreover, Anita date was praised by the entire film fraternity for her top notch performance.

Critical reception 

The film was released worldwide on 12 October 2012. Aiyyaa garnered mixed to negative reviews. While the performance by Rani was praised and admired by the critics, the inadequacy of the plot led to disappointing outcome. Bravos, a review aggregator website specifically for Indian movies, assigned the film an average score of 38 (out of 100) based on 7 reviews from mainstream critics. Madhureeta Mukherjee of Times of India gave it 2.5 stars. "Even with such a talented ensemble, this one turns into a cultural showpiece, and gets lost in translation." said ToI. "Aiyyaa is let down by its weak script" writes Prasanna D Zore of rediff.

Roshni Devi of Koimoi gave it 3 stars. "Watch Aiyyaa for a quirkily different film with very good performances but be warned that it drags." Social Movie Rating site MOZVO gave it 2.9 putting Aiyyaa in 'Average' category. Taran Adarsh of Bollywood Hungama gave it 3 stars. Kanika Sikka of DNA gave it 2.5 stars. "Aiyyaa is an average entertainer" said DNA.

Kerala Films gave 2 stars and added "Aiyya is let down by a confused script." Anupama Chopra of Hindustan Times rated Aiyya 2 stars and added "Whackiness can't carry a film." Reviewers on IMDb gave Aiyya an overall all mark of 4.1 out of 10. Shilpa Jamkhandikar of India Masala rated Aiyaa 3 stars praising the cast and the stories, saying 'What it doesn't have is something that binds all of this together. Kundalkar makes a bizarre mash-up of several genres and ends up with a film that doesn't do too much justice to any one of them."

Raghavendra Singh of FilmFare praised the movie and says "It takes courage to present something never-done-before on the larger-than-life canvas of the big screen. And surprisingly debut director (at least in Hindi films) Sachin Kundalkar shows this trait with great effect in his film Aiyyaa. Hats off to an established star, Rani Mukerji, for showing such conviction in Kundalkar's experimental vision."

The songs "Aga Bai" and "Dreamum Wakupum" became super hits and chartbusters, both getting over 1 million views on YouTube in less than 1 week of being released. Both charted in the top 5 of the India's Airplay Top 100 and have been promoted strongly on TV and Radio broadcasts.

Box office

Overseas 
Aiyyaa was released overseas in a very limited number of theatres (30 in the United Kingdom) and as a result did poorly in overseas markets with its opening collecting around $125 500 overseas; however, it averaged $4,000 in each theatre over its opening weekend. It dropped 90% the following weekend. Subsequently, it was declared a flop by Box Office India for its overseas performance.

India 
Aiyya had many high expectations at the box office from both filmmakers and box office predictors due to high advertisement and raving reviews from the trailers and promos alike. They were expecting 80%–100% occupancy throughout the country on its opening day and that it would collect 15–200 million on the first weekend.

Awards and nominations

References

External links 
 
 

2010s Hindi-language films
Indian romantic musical films
2012 films
Films scored by Amit Trivedi
Viacom18 Studios films
Films directed by Sachin Kundalkar